Patrik Pinte (born 6 January 1997) is a Slovak footballer who currently plays for ViOn Zlaté Moravce.

Club career

Slovan Bratislava
Pinte made his professional Fortuna Liga debut for Slovan Bratislava on 5 March 2017 against Tatran Prešov.

ViOn Zlaté Moravce
After a year with debuting Tatran Liptovský Mikuláš in the Fortuna Liga, Pinte was approached by Ján Kocian and signed a one year contract with an option for further year with ViOn Zlaté Moravce.

References

External links
 
 Futbalnet profile 

1997 births
Living people
Slovak footballers
Association football forwards
ŠK Slovan Bratislava players
Szombathelyi Haladás footballers
KFC Komárno players
FC ŠTK 1914 Šamorín players
MFK Tatran Liptovský Mikuláš players
FC ViOn Zlaté Moravce players
Slovak Super Liga players
2. Liga (Slovakia) players
Nemzeti Bajnokság I players
Expatriate footballers in Hungary
Sportspeople from Dunajská Streda
Hungarians in Slovakia